Paji Wajina Honeychild Yankarr (c. 1912 - 4 December 2004) was an Australian aboriginal artist.

She was born at Kuntumarrajarra in the Great Sandy Desert, and moved in the 1960s to Cherrabun and in the 1970s to an old mission near Junjuwa. There she joined the Karrayili Adult Education Centre and started painting. She took part in a joint exhibition at the Tandanya National Aboriginal Cultural Institute in 1991 and painted throughout the 1990s. She has worked on paper and on canvas, and her work has been described as: "blatant records of her desert country with the recurring theme in  her works being the Jila (waterhole) of various sites in the Great Sandy Desert".

Four of her works are in the collection of the National Gallery of Victoria.

In 2014, the ReDot Fine Art Gallery in Singapore held an exhibition "Kurntumarrajarra - The Estate of Paji Wajina Honeychild Yankarr", named after her birthplace.

References

External links
 List of 25 works, many of them illusstrated

1910s births
2004 deaths
20th-century Australian women artists
20th-century Australian artists
Australian Aboriginal artists
Australian women painters
Artists from Western Australia